This is a list of Croatian television related events from 2003.

Events
9 March - Claudia Beni is selected to represent Croatia at the 2003 Eurovision Song Contest with her song "Više nisam tvoja". She is selected to be the eleventh Croatian Eurovision entry during Dora held at the Summer Stage in Opatija.

Debuts
 15 November - Croatia wins the first Junior Eurovision Song Contest

Television shows

Ending this year

Births

Deaths